Lee Dong-ha(Korean:이동하) (born ) is a South Korean wheelchair curler.

He participated at the 2018 Winter Paralympics where South Korean team finished on fourth place.

Wheelchair curling teams and events

References

External links 

LEE Dongha - Athlete Profile - World Para Nordic Skiing - Live results | International Paralympic Committee

 Video: 

Living people
1973 births
South Korean male curlers
South Korean wheelchair curlers
Paralympic wheelchair curlers of South Korea
Wheelchair curlers at the 2018 Winter Paralympics
21st-century South Korean people